Barking bus garage may refer to these bus garages in London:

Barking bus garage (Arriva), operated by Arriva London with code DX
Barking bus garage (Stagecoach), operated by East London with code BK